CP-135807 is a drug which acts as a potent and selective agonist for the 5-HT1D serotonin receptor, and is used to study the function of this receptor subtype.

See also
 4-HO-MPMI
 5-MeO-MPMI
 Eletriptan
 LY-334370

References

Serotonin receptor agonists
Pyrrolidines
Tryptamines
Aminopyridines
Nitro compounds